Alekos Fassianos (13 December 1935 – 16 January 2022) was a Greek painter.

Life and career 
Fassianos was born in Athens in 1935. After graduating from the Athens School of Fine Arts, he moved to Paris, France, in 1960, to study lithography at the Paris National School of Arts, where he met several artists and writers.

Fassianos used to design the stage decorations for major classic and modern productions. His art has been exhibited in museums and galleries including in Athens, Paris, and throughout Europe, as well as in Tokyo, New York, São Paulo, and Melbourne.

In addition to private collections, his art works can be found in the following museums in France; the Paris Museum of Modern Art; the Maeght Foundation, San Paul de Vence;l, and the Center for Contemporary Art.

Fassianos was very popular in Greece, and some of his works are exhibited in public places: two large murals entitled The Myth of My Neighborhood, can be seen in Athens at the Metaxourgeio metro station. Small sculptures can be seen in front of the Orthodox Church of St. Irene in Athens. A giant vertical mural can be seen in the lobby of the Electra Metropolis Hotel in Athens.

On 13 December 2007, a Fassianos painting titled The Messenger sold for €550,701 at Bonhams in London.

Fassianos died on 16 January 2022, at the age of 86.

Honours 
 1985: Knight of the Order of Arts and Letters (France)
 19??: Member of the Fine Arts Academy of Athens (Greece)
 2009: Honorary Member of the Russian Academy of Fine Arts (Russia)
 2010: Officer of the Order of Arts and Letters (France)
 2013: Officer of the National Order of the Legion of Honour (France)
 2020: Commander of the Order Arts and Letters (France)

Collection and exhibition history

Public and private collections 
France

 National Centre for Visual Arts (CNAP)
 Paris Museum of Modern Art (MAM Paris)
 Mobilier National Museum, Paris
 Maeght Foundation, Saint Paul de Vence
 Villa Tamaris Art Center, La Seyne Sur Mer
 Paul Valéry Museum, Sète
 Center of engraving and printed image, La Louvière
 Museum of Grenoble, Grenoble

Greece and Cyprus

 National Art Gallery - Alexandros Soutzos Museum, Athens
 Benaki museum, Athens
 Cycladic Art Museum, Athens
 Frissiras Museum, Athens
 Theocharakis Foundation, Athens
 American College of Greece (ACG Art), Athens
 Hellenic Olympic Committee, Athens
 European Culture Centre of Delphi, Delphi
 Museum of the Olive and Greek Olive Oil, Sparta
 Macedonian Museum of Contemporary Art (MMCA), Thessaloniki
 Averoff Museum, Metsovo
 Museum of Contemporary Art Andros, Andros
 Municipality of Rhodes Modern Greek Art Museum, Rhodes
 Nikos Kazantzakis Museum, Crete
 Historical Archive - Museum of Hydra (I.A.M.Y), Hydra
 Nicosia Municipal Art Center (NiMAC), Nicosia, Cyprus
 Pierides Museum, Nicosia, Cyprus

Worldwide

 Hellenic Foundation for Culture, New-York, Usa
 Hellenic Foundation for Culture, London, United-Kingdom
 Creator Vesevo, Ercolano, Italy
 Osten Museum of Drawing, Skopje, North Macedonia
 Museum of history and religion, Saint-Petersburg, Russia

Solo shows

1990s 
 1991 Galerie Zoumboulakis, Athens, Greece
 1991 Galerie La Hune - Brenner, Paris, France
 1992 SAGA, Grand Palais, Galerie La Hunne - Brenner, Paris, France
 1992 Galerie Grafika Tokyo, Tokyo, Japan
 1992 Galerie Zoumboulakis, Athens, Greece
 1992 Galerie Origrafica, Malmö, Sweden
 1993 Galerie Beaubourg, Paris, France
 1993 Macedonian Museum of Contemporary Art (MMCA), Retrospective, Thessaloniki, Greece
 1993 Galerie La Hune - Brenner, Paris, France
 1994 Galerie Origrafica, Malmö, Sweden
 1995 Galerie La Hune - Brenner, Paris, France
 1996 Galerie Pudelco, Bonn, Germany
 1996 Kunstkabinett Regensburg, Regensburg, Germany
 1996 Jaski Art Gallery, Amsterdam, Netherlands
 1997 Paul Valery Museum & Nikos Kazantakis Museum (Twinning), Sète, France
 1997 Galerie Grafika Tokyo, Tokyo, Japan
 1998 European Culture Center of Delphi, Retrospective, Delphi, Greece
 1998 Galerie Rachlin-Lemarié, Angels and Loves, Paris, France
 1999 Paul Valery Museum, Sète, France
 1999 NIKAF art fair, Galerie Futura, Tokyo, Japan

2000s 
 2000 Art Miami, Galerie Futura, Miami, Usa
 2000 Galerie La Hune - Brenner, Paris, France
 2000 Galerie Rachlin-Lemarié, Daily Mythology, Paris, France
 2000 Villa Kerylos, Daily Mythology, Beaulieu-sur-Mer, France
 2000 Galerie Bixio 2, Milan, Italy
 2001 Hellenic Foundation for Culture, New York, Usa
 2001 Château de Chenonceau, Le Mythe à bicyclette, Chenonceau, France
 2002 Museum of Cycladic Art, The winners, Athens, Greece
 2003 Hellenic Foundation for Culture, London, United-Kingdom
 2003 Galerie Zannettacci, Geneva, Switzerland
 2003 Galerie La Hune - Brenner, Les Travaux Des Dieux, Paris, France
 2003 Galerie Grafika Tokyo, Tokyo, Japan
 2004 Benaki Museum, Travaux, mythes, Eros, Athens, Greece
 2004 National Art Gallery, A. Soutzos Museum, Everyday Mythologies, Athens, Greece
 2004 Galerie Grafika Tokyo, Tokyo, Japan
 2005 Tem Sanat Galerisi, Alecos Fassianos, Istanbul, Turkey
 2005 Galerie Zannettacci, Geneva, Switzerland
 2007 Galerie Potnia Thiron, L'éternel Retour, Athens, Greece
 2007 Galerie Schneider, Munich, Germany
 2008 Galerie Di Meo, Eroticon, Paris, France
 2008 Central House of Artists, Moscow, Russia
 2008 Galerie Potnia Thiron, Tout ce qu'il nous reste, Athens, Greece
 2009 Galerie Helenbeck, Soft Mythology, Nice, France
 2009 Galerie Zannettacci, Geneva, Switzerland
 2009 Municipality of Rhodes Modern Greek Art Museum, Fassianos - 45 Years Of Creation, Rhodes, Greece

2010s 
 2010 Galerie Grafika Tokyo, The Aegean Breeze, Tokyo, Japan
 2010 Galerie Pierre-Alain Challier, Recovery of happiness, Paris, France
 2010 Galerie Thierry Salvador, Memories, Brussels, Belgium
 2011 Opera Gallery, Fassianos, London, United Kingdom
 2011 Villa Tamaris Art center, Memories, La Seyne-sur-Mer, France
 2011 Galerie Herrmann, Fassianos, Berlin, Germany
 2011 Pavlos Kountouriotis Mansion, Fassianos: Giorgos Economopoulos Collection, Hydra, Grèce
 2011 Tem Sanat Galerisi, Fassianos, Istanbul, Turkey
 2011 Hellenic Museum, Fassianos, Ancient myth - Modern situations, Melbourne, Australia
 2012 Galerie Di Meo, Fassianos, The light rediscovered, Paris, France
 2012 Galerie Estades, Fassianos, Lyon, France
 2012 Abbaye-école de Sorèze, Alecos Fassianos et sa muse Gudrun Von Leitner, Sorèze, France
 2012 Grosvenor Gallery, Everyday myths, London, United Kingdom
 2014 Galerie Zannettacci, Fassianos, Geneva, Switzerland
 2014 Galerie Française - Gérard Schneider, Fassianos, Munich, Germany
 2014 Espace Paul-et-André-Vera, Fassianos, Saint-Germain-en-Laye, France
 2015 Kapopoulos Fine Arts, Alekos Fassianos, Mykonos, Greece
 2016 Museum of History and religion, Ancient Greek Myths in everyday life, Saint-Petersburg, Russia
 2016 Kapopoulos Fine Arts, Apocalypse, Patmos, Greece
 2016 Galerie Pierre-Alain Challier, Fassianos - joie de vivre, Paris, France
 2017 Kapopoulos Fine Arts, Alekos Fassianos, Athens, Greece
 2018 Galerie Sophie Scheidecker, Fassianos, Paris, France
 2018 Iris Gallery, Small works, Athens, Greece
 2018 Historical Archive - Museum of Hydra (I.A.M.Y), Fassianos in France, Hydra, Greece 
 2019 Galerie Estades, Alecos Fassianos, Paris, France

Group exhibitions 
 1963 Pantechnicon, San Francisco
 1965 SWEA, Stockholm
 1968 Biennale of Menton
 1982 Palais des Congrès : Europalia with Caras, Christoforou, Gaïtis & Alkis Pierrakos, Brussels, Belgium
 2000 Kunstkabinett Regensburg, Contemporary Drawings and Sculptures, Regensburg, Germany
 2009 Opera Gallery, Fassianos - Timur D'Vatz, Dubai, United Arab Emirates
 2011 Galerie Pascal Polar, The Figurative Art of Greek Artists, Brussels, Belgium
 2012 Musée du verre et de ses métiers, Daum - Art, luxury & crystal, Dordives, France
 2012 Opera Gallery, A Century of Nudes, Geneva, Switzerland
 2013 Villa Tamaris Art Center, Retrospective, La Seyne-sur-Mer, France
 2014 Galerie Morfi, Group exhibition of Cypriot and Greek artists, Limassol, Cyprus
 2015 Galerie David Hicks, Fassianos - Oppenheim, Paris, France
 2016 Opera Gallery, Shades of blue, Monaco, France
 2016 Ikastikos Kiklos Sianti Gallery, Small Paintings, Athens, Greece
 2016 Manege Central Exhibition Hall, Genii Loci - Greek Art From 1930 To The Present, Saint-Petersburg, Russia
 2017 Manoir du Boulanc, Greeks !, Verderonne, France
 2017 Kapopoulos Fine Arts, Segui – Fassianos, Mykonos, Greece
 2017 Ikastikos Kiklos Sianti Gallery, Small Paintings, Athens, Greece
 2018 Paul Valéry Museum, Painting and Poetry, Sète, France
 2018 Moca Skopje, The Greek Collection, Skopje, North Macedonia
 2018 Maeght Foundation, The Spirit of a Collection : Gifts, Saint-Paul-de-Vence, France
 2019 Roma Gallery, Alekos Fassianos - Dimitris Mytaras, Athens, Greece
 2019 Ikastikos Kiklos Sianti Gallery, A Beach in the City, Athens, Greece
 2019 Theocharakis Foundation, Alekos Fassianos, Vangelis Chronis – 30 Years of Friendship, Paintings and Poetry, Athens, Greece
 2020 Galerie Élysée Saint-Honoré, Yves Navarre meets Alekos Fassianos, Paris, France

See also 
 Art in modern Greece
 National Gallery of Greece
 Contemporary Greek Art

References

1935 births
2022 deaths
20th-century painters
Artists from Athens
Greek contemporary artists
Greek painters
Lithographers
École des Beaux-Arts alumni
Officiers of the Légion d'honneur
Recipients of the Ordre des Arts et des Lettres